The List of Team Argos-Shimano riders contains riders from the UCI women’s cycling team Team Argos-Shimano, which have had the name Skil–Argos in 2012.

2018 Team Sunweb

2017

2016 Team Liv–Plantur

2015 Team Liv-Plantur

As of 1 January 2015. Ages as of 1 January 2015.

2014 Team Giant-Shimano

2013 Team Argos-Shimano

2012 Skil–Argos

2011 Skil Koga

 
 
 
  (From 23/6)
  (Until 6/6)
  (From 1/8 as trainee)
 
 
 
  (From 12/6)
 
Source

See also

References

Giant-Shimano
riders